Edward Young (born Edward Osaretinmwen Erhahon) is a Nigerian filmmaker known for his debut production film Kasanova that became a box office success as the highest grossing Nigerian film in September 2019. He was recognized by the Ooni of Ife Oba Adeyeye Enitan Ogunwusi, Ojaja II in 2020 for his contributions in the Nollywood sector.

Life 
Eddy was born to the family of Mr and Mrs Erhahon in Benin city, Edo state, Nigeria. He had all his Education in Benin city and received a Bachelor of Science degree in Adult and Non-Formal Education from the University of Benin. His Career started as an on Air personality with Independent Television and Radio Benin and later served in Hitfm Calabar.
His major industry break was in January 2019 when he produced Kasanova which has  received reviews from critics and viewers, the film made its debut in Nigerian cinema in September 2019 and also debuted on Netflix in June 2020.  Also in 2020, he produced a web series titled  which was premiered on 29 April 2020.

Filmography
2020 Old school lives on (producer)
2020 Man like Jimmy (producer) 
2020 The Badchelors (web series) (producer)
2019 Kasanova (producer)
2019 Dejavu (producer) 
2019 What happened on 3rd street (producer)

See also 

 List of Nigerian film producers

References 

Nigerian film producers
Nigerian film directors
People from Edo State
University of Benin (Nigeria) alumni
Living people
Year of birth missing (living people)
Nigerian media executives
Nigerian media personalities